Robert Geller (born 1976, in Hamburg, Germany) is a German-born American fashion designer.

Early life and education
He graduated with a degree in fashion design at RISD in 2001 and moved to New York to join Marc Jacobs shortly after.

Career
In New York, Geller met Alexandre Plokhov, a patternmaker, and partnered up with Alexandre to launch menswear brand Cloak, which went on to win the Ecco Domani award in 2003 and the Vogue/CFDA Grant in 2004. Robert left Cloak after the Fall 2004 collection. Cloak finally closed down in Spring 2007.

In 2006, Robert launched a women's line called Harald. Initially meant to only be knitwear, the line exploded into a full fledge collection, helping launch Robert back into the fashion spotlight. The attention allowed him to secure financial backing for a menswear label under his own name. In Fall 2007 Robert Geller menswear debuted at New York Fashion Week.

Awards and honors
Geller received the GQ Best New Menswear Designer Award in  2009. Geller was a finalist for the 2010 CFDA / Vogue Fashion Fund prize, and won CFDA Swarovski Award for Menswear in 2011.

Personal life
He is married to fashion designer Ana Beatriz Lerario, designer of Lerario Beatriz. The couple met while working together at Marc Jacobs.

References

Living people
1976 births
German fashion designers
Menswear designers